Feriqevë (Serbian Cyrillic:  Фирицеја) is a village in Kamenica municipality, Kosovo. It is located in the Gollak mountains. It has 61 inhabitants, all of whom are Albanian.

References 

Villages in Kamenica, Kosovo